Jenijoy La Belle (born 1943) is an American professor emeritus of English literature at California Institute of Technology. Hired in 1969, she became the first female professor in Caltech history. She is known for her fight to attain tenure in the early '70s, also at Caltech. She was granted tenure in 1979. She retired in 2007.

Biography
Raised in Olympia, Washington, she attended Olympia High School. After high school, she attended the University of Washington in Seattle, where she received a B.A. in English in 1965. In 1969, she received her Ph.D. in the discipline from the University of California, San Diego. Her dissertation concerned the poetry of Theodore Roethke. That same year, she was hired as professor at Caltech.

Landmark Caltech tenure case
In 1969, La Belle began teaching at Caltech, making her the first female professor in Caltech history. In 1974, the English department recommended her for tenure. The decision was overturned by the division chair, economic historian Robert Huttenback. After filing a complaint with the EEOC and with the support of several notable academics, including Richard Feynman and Robert F. Christy, she was finally awarded tenure in 1979. Olga Taussky Todd was a research associate at Caltech from 1957 to 1971 and received tenure in 1963; however, she did not become a full professor until 1971.

Published works
In 1975, Le Belle co-authored Night Thoughts or the Complaint and the Consolation Illustrated by William Blake with Robert N. Essick. In 1976, she published The Echoing Wood of Theodore Roethke. In 1977, she again joined with Robert N. Essick to publish Flaxman's Illustrations to Homer. In 1988, she published Herself Beheld: The Literature of the Looking Glass.

References

External links
 Caltech bio page

Living people
1943 births
California Institute of Technology faculty
University of California, San Diego alumni